Rory Daniel McIlroy  (born 4 May 1989) is a professional golfer from Northern Ireland who is a member of both the European and PGA Tours. He is a former world number one in the Official World Golf Ranking, and has spent over 100 weeks in that position during his career. He is a four-time major champion, winning the 2011 U.S. Open, 2012 PGA Championship, 2014 Open Championship and 2014 PGA Championship. Along with Jack Nicklaus and Tiger Woods, he is one of three players to win four majors by the age of 25.

McIlroy had a successful amateur career, topping the World Amateur Golf Ranking for one week as a 17-year-old in 2007. Later that year, he turned professional and soon established himself on the European Tour. He had his first win on the European Tour in 2009 and on the PGA Tour in 2010. In 2011, at the age of 22, he became the youngest player ever to reach €10 million in career earnings on the European Tour. In 2012, he became the youngest player to reach $10 million in career earnings on the PGA Tour.

McIlroy has represented Europe, Great Britain & Ireland, and Ireland as both an amateur and a professional. At the Ryder Cup, he played for Europe against the United States in 2010, 2012, 2014,  2016, 2018 and 2021, with Europe winning in 2010, 2012, 2014 and 2018. For his individual and team achievements, he has twice been named RTÉ Sports Person of the Year, in 2011 and 2014.

Early life, family, and early golf playing
Mcllroy was born on 4 May 1989 in Holywood, County Down, Northern Ireland, as the only child of Rosie McDonald and Gerry McIlroy. He attended St. Patrick's Primary School and then Sullivan Upper School (Grammar).

He was introduced to golf at an exceptionally young age by his father, who coached him. Gerry McIlroy is a fine golfer himself, who once played at a scratch handicap level. He asked his father virtually every day to take him to Holywood Golf Club. Family lore relates that he received a new golf club as a present, being shown the correct grip by his father, then taking the club to bed with him that night, with his hands holding the club properly. McIlroy joined Holywood Golf Club and became the youngest member at the club at age seven. A video on golf technique produced by champion Nick Faldo was his early favourite.

McIlroy's father held down several jobs to earn additional income for his son's golf development. His mother worked extra shifts at the local 3M plant. McIlroy's first significant international victory came in the World Championship for the 9–10 age group bracket at the Doral Golf Resort & Spa in Miami, Florida. He learned his early golf at the Holywood Golf Club, which he still retains as his home course. He started his early training with Michael Bannon, previously the Golf Professional of Holywood Golf Club, who is also his current coach and dedicated mentor.

Amateur career
At the age of 15, McIlroy was a member of the Irish team at the 2004 European Boys' Team Championship and of Europe's winning 2004 Junior Ryder Cup team against United States on foreign soil in Ohio.

In 2005, he became the youngest-ever winner of both the West of Ireland Championship and the Irish Close Championship. Mcllroy retained the West of Ireland Championship in 2006 and followed that up with back-to-back wins at the Irish Close Championship.

In late 2004, at age 15, he signed a letter of intent to play collegiate golf at East Tennessee State University, but after his wins in 2005, he decided to forgo the golf scholarship and continue to play amateur golf in Europe. In July 2005, at age 16, McIlroy shot a new competitive course record score of 61 on the Dunluce links of Royal Portrush Golf Club.

At 16 years old, he was part of the combined Northern Ireland and Republic of Ireland team at the 2005 European Amateur Team Championship. However, team Ireland did not make it to the quarter-finals. Two years later, Ireland won the championship at Western Gailes Golf Club in Scotland, with McIlroy on the team again, this time with 20-year-old future Open champion Shane Lowry as one of his teammates and with McIlroy as tied individual leader in the initial stroke-play rounds. It was Ireland's first title in the championship since 1987.

In August 2006, he won the European Amateur at Biella Golf Club, near Milan, Italy, with a score of 274. In October 2006, McIlroy represented Ireland in the Eisenhower Trophy, which is the Amateur World Team Championship. On 6 February 2007, he became the second man to top the World Amateur Golf Ranking, though he lost the top spot after just one week.

McIlroy shot a bogey-free opening round of 3-under-par 68 at the 2007 Open Championship at Carnoustie, his first major championship entry. He shot +5 overall and was the highest finishing amateur, winning the silver medal.

McIlroy was part of the Great Britain & Ireland team at the 2007 Walker Cup, held at the Royal County Down Golf Club. On the first day of the event he was paired with Jonathan Caldwell for morning foursomes, and the match was halved. In the afternoon he faced Billy Horschel in singles, but Horschel won 1 up. On the second day McIlroy and Caldwell lost in morning foursomes by the score of 2 & 1. In the afternoon he faced Horschel in singles again, and this time he won by the score of 1 up. McIlroy's overall record was (1–2–1) in Win–loss–tie format. The United States came out victorious by a score of 12½ to 11½.

McIlroy made his first appearance in a European Tour event a few days after turning 16, when he took part in the 2005 British Masters. He made the cut on the European Tour for the first time as a 17-year-old at the 2007 Dubai Desert Classic, where he had to forego prize money of over €7,600 due to his amateur status.

Professional career

2007
McIlroy turned professional on 18 September 2007, the day before the Quinn Direct British Masters. He signed with International Sports Management. At the Quinn Direct British Masters, McIlroy shot 290 (+2), which put him in a tie for 42nd place. He finished in 3rd place at the Alfred Dunhill Links Championship in October. The next week, he secured his card for 2008 by finishing in a tie for 4th place at the Open de Madrid Valle Romano. He became the youngest Affiliate Member in the history of The European Tour to earn a tour card. On the 2007 European Tour season, he earned €277,255 and finished in 95th place on the Order of Merit list. He was the highest ranked associate member.

2008
Before his season started, Tiger Woods invited McIlroy to play in the 2007 Target World Challenge, held in December, and the 2008 AT&T National, held in July. McIlroy declined the invitation, preferring to play the European Open the week of the AT&T National.

McIlroy started his 2008 European Tour season at the UBS Hong Kong Open. He did not make the one-under cut. He entered the top 200 of the Official World Golf Ranking for the first time on 27 January 2008. On 7 September 2008, McIlroy took a four-stroke lead into the final round of the Omega European Masters in Crans-sur-Sierre, Switzerland, but finished in a tie for first place with Frenchman Jean-François Lucquin and lost in a play-off.

McIlroy finished the European Tour season in November 2008 with six top-10 placements and ranked 79th in the World Golf Ranking.

2009
After finishing second in the UBS Hong Kong Open in November 2008, McIlroy attained his highest world ranking position of 50. He finished the 2008 calendar year at 39th in the world rankings after finishing joint 3rd in the South African Open. This earned him an invitation to the 2009 Masters Tournament. His first professional win came at age 19 when he won the Dubai Desert Classic on 1 February 2009, this win took him to 16th in the world rankings.

In the 2009 WGC-Accenture Match Play Championship, McIlroy reached the quarterfinals. In the first round he defeated Louis Oosthuizen 2 & 1, in the second round he beat Hunter Mahan 1-up, and in the third round he beat Tim Clark, 4 & 3. He lost to Geoff Ogilvy, who won the tournament, in the quarterfinals 2 & 1. McIlroy continued to play on the PGA Tour until May. He finished tied for 13th at the Honda Classic, tied for 20th at the WGC-CA Championship and tied for 19th at the Shell Houston Open.

In April 2009, McIlroy made his first Masters Tournament appearance, his first major championship as a professional. He finished the tournament tied for 20th place, two strokes under par for the tournament. Of the players to make the cut, McIlroy achieved the third-highest average driving distance, beaten only by Dustin Johnson and Andrés Romero. McIlroy played in two more events on the PGA Tour after the Masters Tournament including his first appearance at The Players Championship, where he missed the cut.

McIlroy then returned to Europe and recorded two top-25 finishes leading up to his first U.S. Open. He finished fifth at the BMW PGA Championship and 12th at the European Open. McIlroy played in his second major as a professional at the 2009 U.S. Open. His final round of 68 (−2) helped him finish in a tie for 10th, his first top-10 finish in a major. The following week, McIlroy finished in 15th place at the BMW International Open. McIlroy played in his first Open Championship as a professional in July and finished T-47. He finished T-3 at the 2009 PGA Championship.

McIlroy finished the 2009 season ranked second on the Race to Dubai, behind Lee Westwood, and in November he entered the top 10 of the world rankings for the first time. McIlroy finished 2009 ranked 9th in the world. In November 2009, McIlroy announced that he would join the American-based PGA Tour for the 2010 season.

McIlroy accepted an invitation from Gary Player to participate in the 2009 Nedbank Golf Challenge at the Gary Player Country Club at Sun City, South Africa in December, but withdrew after feeling unwell.

2010

McIlroy finished 3rd at the 2010 Abu Dhabi Golf Championship. As defending champion at the 2010 Dubai Desert Classic, McIlroy shot a final round of 73 to finish in a tie for fifth place.

In the 2010 WGC-Accenture Match Play Championship, McIlroy beat Kevin Na 1-up in the first round and then lost on a playoff hole to Oliver Wilson. After the Accenture Match Play Championship, McIlroy took time off from golf due to a sore back. After a two-week break McIlroy returned in the 2010 Honda Classic and finished in a tie for 40th.

On 2 May, McIlroy recorded his first PGA Tour win after shooting 62 in the final round of the Quail Hollow Championship. The round set a new course record, and concluded with six consecutive scores of three. He became the first player since Tiger Woods to win a PGA Tour event prior to his 21st birthday. The win earned him a two-year Tour exemption. On 2 June, McIlroy played in the Memorial Skins Game at Muirfield Village Golf Club in Dublin, Ohio. McIlroy finished tied for 10th place at that same week's Memorial Tournament.

On 15 July 2010, McIlroy began the Open Championship on the Old Course at St Andrews by shooting a 9-under-par 63 on the opening day, the lowest-ever first round score in the 150-year history of the Open Championship, and tying the course record. He missed a 5-foot birdie putt on the 17th, "The Road Hole", which would have given him the outright record. His tied for third finish in the 2010 Open Championship sent him to a career high world ranking of seventh.

McIlroy missed out on a chance to win the 2010 PGA Championship when he three-putted the 15th green to fall out of a tie for the lead. His final-hole birdie putt narrowly missed the hole to leave him one stroke out of the playoff between Bubba Watson and eventual winner Martin Kaymer. McIlroy finished tied for third. On 4 October 2010, McIlroy won a crucial half-point to help Europe regain the Ryder Cup.

Following the Ryder Cup, he announced in November that he would return to play full-time on the European Tour, although he also stated that he would continue to play 11 or 12 tournaments in the US per year. He attributed the decision to having closer friends on the European Tour, his part in the Ryder Cup victory, and wanting to be nearer his girlfriend and family.

McIlroy later stated that he regretted his 2010 decision to give up his PGA Tour card, and his skipping the 2010 Players Championship at TPC Sawgrass. McIlroy's manager Chubby Chandler's aversion to the PGA Tour was cited by McIlroy as one of the main reasons for their later professional split.

2011

Masters: final round collapse
On 7 April, McIlroy shot a bogey-free 7-under-par 65 in the first round of the Masters Tournament in Augusta, Georgia to take the lead after the first day of the four-day competition. At the time, he was the youngest player to lead the Masters Tournament at the close of the first day. On Friday, he shot 69 to lead by two strokes over Jason Day with a 10-under-par score. On Saturday, he shot 70 to finish at 12-under-par, four strokes ahead of four other challengers. However, on the fourth and final day, he shot the worst round in history by any professional golfer leading after the third round of the Masters Tournament. McIlroy scored one-over-par 37 on the first nine, and still had the lead, but shot a round of 80, finishing T15 at 4-under for the tournament.

McIlroy failed to make the cut in his title defense at Quail Hollow in early May, and was well off the pace at the BMW PGA Championship. He held the 18 hole lead at the Memorial Tournament but finished in 5th place.

U.S. Open win
On 19 June 2011, McIlroy won his first major championship victory at the U.S. Open at Congressional in Bethesda, Maryland. McIlroy's level of play was unrivaled throughout the week, and his dominance of play is evidenced by his 8-stroke margin of victory over 2nd-place finisher Jason Day. McIlroy set several records in his victory, most notably, his 72-hole aggregate score of 268 (16-under) was a new U.S. Open record. The 268 aggregate beat the previous record of 272 held by Jack Nicklaus (Baltusrol, 1980), Lee Janzen (Baltusrol, 1993), Tiger Woods (Pebble Beach, 2000), and Jim Furyk (Olympia Fields, 2003). The 16-under in relation to par beat Tiger Woods' 12 under at Pebble Beach Golf Links in 2000. He became the youngest winner since Bobby Jones in 1923. The victory lifted McIlroy's position in the Official World Golf Ranking to a then career high of number four.

On 17 June, during the second round of the US Open, McIlroy would become the first player in the history of the championship to reach a score of 13-under-par at any point in the tournament. He achieved the feat by making birdie at the 17th hole in the second round. Despite a double bogey on the final hole, his two-day total of 131 (65-66, 11-under-par) set a championship scoring record as the lowest 36-hole total in U.S. Open history. The score was one better than Ricky Barnes' 132 in 2009. He was also the fastest golfer to reach double digits under par in the U.S. Open, reaching 10 under par in 26 holes.

On 18 June, during the championship's third round, he became the first player to reach 14-under par at the tournament by making a birdie at the 15th hole, and would finish the round off to capture the 54-hole U.S. Open scoring record, posting a 3-round total of 199 (-14). In doing so, he also built an eight-stroke lead going into the final round. A final round of 69 allowed him to claim his first major championship setting the 72-hole record.

Rest of 2011
McIlroy took a month off from competitive golf. At The Open Championship he struggled in tough weather over a difficult layout at Royal St George's Golf Club, failing to contend with the conditions. He was again a non-factor at the PGA Championship at Atlanta Athletic Club after injuring his wrist on the 3rd hole of the first round after attempting to play a stroke from behind a tree root. McIlroy went on to win the Lake Malaren Shanghai Masters in a playoff against Anthony Kim. In November, he finished tied for 4th at the WGC-HSBC Champions to move to a then career-high of number two in the Official World Golf Ranking. In December 2011, he won the UBS Hong Kong Open by two strokes.

2012

McIlroy's first tournament of the year was at the Abu Dhabi HSBC Golf Championship during the desert swing of the European Tour at the end of January. The tournament was in the spotlight due to its high-profile field including Tiger Woods, Luke Donald and Lee Westwood. McIlroy played alongside Woods and Donald in the marquee group during the first two days. McIlroy shot rounds of 67-72-68 to start round 4 in joint 3rd place behind joint leaders Robert Rock and Tiger Woods. He shot a 3-under-par 69 on Sunday to finish lone second, one stroke behind winner Robert Rock.

At the Omega Dubai Desert Classic McIlroy finished tied 5th on 14-under-par, four strokes behind winner Rafa Cabrera-Bello. He continued to play well at the WGC-Accenture Match Play Championship in Arizona where he won matches against George Coetzee, Anders Hanson, Miguel Ángel Jiménez, Bae Sang-moon and Lee Westwood before losing to Hunter Mahan in the final. After 10 holes in the final match, McIlroy was 4 down to Mahan, but cut the deficit to 2 down through 16 holes. The 17th hole was halved with pars, securing the win for Mahan. There was anticipation surrounding the semi-final match between McIlroy and Westwood, as the winner would become the number one golfer in the world if they also won the final. McIlroy's runner-up finish moved him up to number two in the world while also putting him at the top of the Race to Dubai leaderboard.

The following week, McIlroy continued good form and won the Honda Classic in Palm Beach Gardens, Florida, and with it claimed the Number 1 spot in the world rankings. He started the fourth round in first place at 11-under-par after rounds of 66-67-66, ahead of a chasing pack including Tiger Woods, Lee Westwood and Keegan Bradley. McIlroy shot a final round of 69 to claim his third PGA Tour title and finished two strokes ahead of Tiger Woods and Tom Gillis. McIlroy became the second youngest World Number 1 and moved up to fourth place in the FedEx Cup standings.

McIlroy played the following week at the WGC-Cadillac Championship in Miami, Florida. His recent good form began to dwindle slightly on Thursday, when he shot a 1-over par 73. However, he shot 69 and 65 the next two days to begin the fourth round in tied 8th place. Going into the back 9 on Sunday, he had a chance of winning his second title of 2012 in as many weeks due to the leaders faltering. However two late bogeys halted his chance and he settled for 3rd place, two strokes behind winner Justin Rose.

McIlroy lost his number one ranking on 18 March to Luke Donald after Donald won the Transitions Championship. McIlroy was one stroke off of the lead going into the weekend at The Masters but struggled in his last two rounds and finished in a tie for 40th. He regained the top spot in the world rankings on 15 April but lost it to Donald again on 29 April. On 6 May, McIlroy was in contention at the Wells Fargo Championship and went to a playoff with Rickie Fowler and D. A. Points. Fowler won the tournament on the first playoff hole with a birdie. The runner-up finish put McIlroy back at the top of the Official World Golf Ranking. After the runner-up finish, McIlroy would later miss the cut in his next three events, and fell again from number one ranking.

PGA Championship win
On 12 August 2012, McIlroy won the 2012 PGA Championship at Kiawah Island (Ocean Course) in South Carolina. McIlroy would win by eight strokes, setting a margin-of-victory record for the PGA Championship with a birdie on the final hole. The record stood since Jack Nicklaus won the 1980 PGA Championship by seven strokes. McIlroy started the final round with a three-stroke lead and shot a flawless, bogey-free 66 to run away from the field. At the time, McIlroy's win at 22 years old made him the youngest multiple major champion since Seve Ballesteros won the 1980 Masters Tournament. McIlroy's win also regained him the world's number one ranking.

Pursuit of the FedEx Cup
McIlroy finished the regular season third in the FedEx Cup standings. At The Barclays, the first of four playoff events, he finished in a tie for 24th, dropping him to fourth in the standings. McIlroy won the following week at the Deutsche Bank Championship to take the top spot in the standings. McIlroy entered the final round three strokes behind Louis Oosthuizen and defeated him by one stroke. The win also put McIlroy at the top of the PGA Tour money list. McIlroy's success continued the following week when he won the BMW Championship. He was 40-under par for his two playoff tournament victories. With the win, he became the first European to win four PGA Tour events in a single season and the only person other than Tiger Woods to win four events in a season since 2005.

Ryder Cup
McIlroy topped the qualification standings for the 2012 Ryder Cup. He picked up three points for the European team, partnering with Graeme McDowell in two foursomes and one fourballs match, and with Ian Poulter in the second-day fourballs. On the final day, a mix up with his tee time meant that he arrived only 12 minutes before he was due to tee off, after being escorted in by a police officer. He defeated Keegan Bradley 2 & 1 to help Europe win 14½-13½.

Race to Dubai champion
Following Europe's victory in the Ryder Cup, McIlroy turned his attention to winning the Race to Dubai. A second place at the BMW Masters was followed by a third place at the Barclays Singapore Open to wrap up the title with two events remaining. To finish off his season, he won the DP World Tour Championship, Dubai, making birdie on the last five holes to beat Justin Rose by two strokes. He thus duplicated Luke Donald's 2011 feat of winning both the PGA Tour and European Tour money titles in the same year.

2013

McIlroy began 2013 with high aspirations, but mostly did not fare well in early tournaments. Struggling with an equipment change, having signed a large endorsement deal with Nike in January, he withdrew from the Honda Classic in February, and finished in two over par and in a tie for 25th place at the 2013 Masters Tournament. McIlroy won the 2013 Emirates Australian Open on the 72nd hole. He beat Australian Adam Scott by one stroke.

2014
In January, McIlroy was hit with a two-shot penalty for not taking proper and full relief after driving onto a spectator pathway in the Abu Dhabi HSBC Golf Championship, his first event of the season. He was alerted to his mistake by Scottish caddie Dave Renwick after his round and, after signing for a 70 instead of a 68 to reflect the penalty, he told reporters: "There are many stupid rules in golf and this is one of them." The two-shot penalty ultimately cost him dearly, as he lost the tournament by a single shot.

In March, McIlroy lost in a four-man sudden-death playoff at the Honda Classic on the PGA Tour, despite leading the tournament through all four rounds until the back nine on Sunday. He shot a final-round 74 (+4) and had a superb second shot to the par-five 18th in regulation play to qualify for the playoff, after missing the eagle putt for the win. He lost on the first extra hole, when Russell Henley was the only one of the four to birdie the hole.

In May in England, McIlroy won the BMW PGA Championship at Wentworth by one stroke. He carded a six-under-par 66 final round to beat Thomas Bjørn, who started the day seven strokes clear of McIlroy. The win was McIlroy's first on either of the two major tours in 18 months.

Open Championship win
On 20 July, McIlroy won the 2014 Open Championship at Royal Liverpool by two strokes over Rickie Fowler and Sergio García. The victory was the third major championship of his career, having led the field after each round of the tournament. McIlroy and Tiger Woods are the only golfers to win both The Silver Medal and The Gold Medal at The Open Championship. His third major title having won the 2011 U.S. Open and 2012 PGA Championship, McIlroy became the third European to win three different majors and joined Jack Nicklaus and Tiger Woods as one of three golfers since the first Masters Tournament in 1934 to win three majors by the age of 25.

PGA Championship win
A week after winning his first-ever WGC event at the WGC-Bridgestone Invitational, McIlroy would edge runner-up Phil Mickelson by one shot to collect his fourth major championship victory with a win at the 2014 PGA Championship at Valhalla in Louisville, Kentucky.

After McIlroy's victory at his own Nicklaus-designed Valhalla Golf Club, golfing great Jack Nicklaus said of McIlroy: "Rory is an unbelievable talent. I think Rory has an opportunity to win 15 or 20 majors or whatever he wants to do if he wants to keep playing. I love his swing."

2015
McIlroy's second tournament of the year yielded victory as he won the European Tour's Omega Dubai Desert Classic for a second time. With a score of 22-under-par, matching the record set by Stephen Gallacher and Thomas Bjørn. He missed the cut in his first start of the PGA Tour season at the Honda Classic. It was his first missed cut on the PGA Tour since the 2013 Open Championship, a streak of 22 consecutive events. He finished fourth at the 2015 Masters Tournament, his best career Masters finish. On 3 May, he won the WGC-Cadillac Match Play event held at TPC Harding Park in San Francisco. This was his second World Golf Championship, in the process becoming only the third player behind Tiger Woods and Jack Nicklaus to win 10 PGA tour events and four majors by the age of 25.

On 16 May, while playing in the Wells Fargo Championship, McIlroy shot a course-record 61 at the Quail Hollow Club in Charlotte, North Carolina. He went on to win the championship for a second time, by 7 strokes with a tournament record score. This was his second win in three straight events.

McIlroy's tough schedule eventually caught up with him as he missed the cut at his next two events. First, at the BMW PGA Championship, he opened with an average one-under-par 71 but faded the next day to a 6-over 78. He claimed mental fatigue got the better of him and not its physical counterpart. The following week at the Irish Open, McIlroy shot a first-round 80 to lie 9-over and in a tie for last place. The following day he managed a level-par 71 around Royal County Down which left him four shots off the halfway cut. McIlroy stated he had left himself too much to do after a poor Thursday performance in front of his home Northern Irish fans and at the event he now hosts. He later said he was looking forward to a break after five tournaments in a row.

Just a little over a week prior to The Open Championship McIlroy injured his left anterior talofibular ligament (ankle ligament). This led to him missing the tournament and the subsequent WGC-Bridgestone Invitational. He made his return in the 2015 PGA Championship and made the cut finishing in 17th place.

Race to Dubai
Going into the final tournament of the European Tour season, the DP World Tour Championship, Dubai, McIlroy was leading the Race to Dubai standings. However six other players were in contention for the season end prize going into the event, with Danny Willett being the closest challenger. McIlroy posted a score of 21 under to win the tournament by a single stroke from Andy Sullivan. This was his second victory in the lucrative year-end tournament and his third Race to Dubai title in four years.

Following these successes McIlroy was awarded the European Tour Golfer of the Year Award, this was his third win of the award.

2016
Chasing his first win of the year, McIlroy took a three-shot lead into the final round of the WGC-Cadillac Championship at Doral, but faltered with a two-over-par 74 to finish two shots behind winner Adam Scott. At the 2016 Masters, McIlroy was in the final group in the third round alongside Jordan Spieth but faltered to a birdie-free five-over-par 77 and followed that up with a one-under-par 71 on Sunday to finish T10. Afterwards, he said he was affected by the pressure of trying to achieve the Grand Slam.

In May, McIlroy claimed his first victory of the year at his home Irish Open – a tournament hosted by the Rory Foundation. He finished three strokes clear of Russell Knox and Bradley Dredge and subsequently gave the €666,000 winner's cheque to charity. On 5 September, he won the Deutsche Bank Championship in Norton, Massachusetts (near Boston). He finished two shots clear of Paul Casey. He produced a near flawless final round of 65 to win for the first time on the PGA Tour in 2016 at the Deutsche Bank Championship.

At the final event of the PGA Tour season, the 2016 Tour Championship, McIlroy overcame a two-shot deficit after the third round to force a playoff with Ryan Moore and Kevin Chappell, winning the competition at the fourth playoff hole with a birdie 3 on the par 4 16th. The result put McIlroy at the top of the FedEx Cup and won him the $10 million bonus pool.

At the 2016 Ryder Cup, McIlroy played five matches winning three points, all when paired with Thomas Pieters: the European duo overcome Dustin Johnson and Matt Kuchar, 3 and 2, in the Friday fourballs, Rickie Fowler and Phil Mickelson, 4 and 2, in the Saturday foursomes, and Brooks Koepka and Johnson, 3 and 1, in the Saturday fourballs. McIlroy paired with Andy Sullivan in the Friday foursomes, losing to Mickelson and Fowler, 1 up. In the Sunday singles, he lost to Patrick Reed, 1 up, thanks to a birdie by the American at the last hole.

2017
At the end of 2016, Nike announced their withdrawal from the golf equipment market, releasing players from their contracts early. After spending several months trying different clubs and balls, McIlroy signed a $100 million endorsement deal with TaylorMade.

McIlroy did not win during 2017, but still had a solid year recording top 10 finishes at the Masters, The Open and 3 WGC events. He was hampered throughout the season by a rib injury first sustained at the BMW SA Open in January, where he lost out on the title in a playoff to Graeme Storm, and played a limited schedule as a result. After missing out on qualifying for the end-of-season Tour Championship on the PGA Tour, he decided to sit out the remainder of the year to rest and recover fully.

2018
McIlroy returned after more than 100 days away at the Abu Dhabi HSBC Championship in late January. Prior to the tournament, McIlroy revealed he has a slight heart irregularity but played down the impact on his golf. McIlroy finished runner-up to Li Haotong in the Omega Dubai Desert Classic. He lost out by one stroke, having led by two with five holes to play. It was his 16th runner-up finish on the European Tour and the 22nd runner-up finish of his career. On 18 March 2018, he won the Arnold Palmer Invitational with a final-round 64, his first win since winning the Tour Championship (and FedEx Cup) in 2016.

In April, in his tenth appearance at the Masters Tournament, McIlroy was in contention during the final round. McIlroy and Patrick Reed teed off in the final pairing at Augusta National with McIlroy three shots behind Reed. However, McIlroy shot a 74 to finish six back of the winner, Reed, and was thus not able to take advantage of this opportunity to win a green jacket. He tied for second with a score of six-under-par at the 2018 Open Championship.

In September 2018, McIlroy qualified for the European team participating in the 2018 Ryder Cup. Team Europe beat Team USA 17 1/2 to 10 1/2 at Le Golf National outside of Paris, France.

2019: pursuit of second FedEx Cup
McIlroy started his year on the PGA Tour in good form with five straight top-6 finishes: tied for 4th at the Sentry Tournament of Champions; tied for 5th at the Farmers Insurance Open; tied for 4th at the Genesis Open; runner-up finish at the WGC-Mexico Championship; tied for 6th at the Arnold Palmer Invitational. He subsequently won the Players Championship with a score of −16, becoming just the second British winner of the tournament after Sandy Lyle in 1987. With the win, he also joined Jack Nicklaus and Tiger Woods as the only players to win four majors and 15 PGA Tour titles before the age of 30.

On 9 June 2019, McIlroy won the RBC Canadian Open by 7 strokes in Hamilton, Ontario. He shot a final-round 61 to win the tournament. He became the sixth golfer to win the career Triple Crown (possessing the PGA Tour's three oldest events by winning the three national championships; The Open in 2014, the U.S. Open in 2011, and the Canadian Open).

On 25 August 2019, McIlroy clinched his second season-long FedEx Cup by winning the Tour Championship at East Lake Golf Club. The winning payout was $15 million, the largest in golf history. He became the second player to win multiple FedEx Cups. Following his FedEx Cup victory, McIlroy was named the 2018–19 PGA Tour Player of the Year. It was the third time in his career he had won the Jack Nicklaus Award..

On 3 November 2019, McIlroy won the WGC-HSBC Champions tournament in a playoff against Xander Schauffele. The event was held outside of Shanghai, China. This event was part of the 2019 European Tour and the 2019–20 PGA Tour. On 10 December 2019, McIlroy informed that he would miss the European Tour's Saudi International tournament in Riyadh and stated morality issues in going to the nation. "One hundred percent, there's a morality to it as well," his statement read.

2020
On 9 February, McIlroy gained the world number one ranking from Brooks Koepka. On 17 May 2020, McIlroy, alongside Dustin Johnson, secured a win in a charity skins game played under the nearest-the-pin shot rule, as golf returned to television after nine weeks. The duo ended up winning £1.53 million for coronavirus relief funds. On 20 July, Jon Rahm overtook McIlroy to become the number one in the Official World Golf Ranking.

2021
In January, McIlroy held the 54-hole lead at the Abu Dhabi HSBC Championship. A final round 72 saw him finish in third place, five shots behind eventual winner Tyrrell Hatton.

In May, McIlroy won the Wells Fargo Championship at Quail Hollow Club in Charlotte, North Carolina by one stroke. He won this tournament for the third time. This was his 19th PGA Tour victory.

In August, McIlroy finished in a tie for third place at the Olympic Games, representing Ireland. He lost in a 7-man playoff for the bronze medal.

In September, McIlroy played on the European team in the 2021 Ryder Cup at Whistling Straits in Kohler, Wisconsin. The US team won 19–9 and McIlroy went 1–3–0 and won his Sunday singles match against Xander Schauffele.

In October, McIlroy won the CJ Cup at The Summit Club in Las Vegas, Nevada by one stroke. He overcame a 9-shot deficit prior to beginning the final two rounds, but a 62–66 on the last two days saw him win by one over Collin Morikawa. This was his 20th PGA Tour victory, gaining him life membership. He became only the sixth player since 1960 to reach 20 wins on the tour before their 33rd birthday.

In November, McIlroy held the 54-hole lead at the DP World Tour Championship, Dubai, looking to become the first player to win the event for a third time. However, a poor finish on the back nine saw him fall out of contention, eventually finishing five shots behind winner Collin Morikawa.

2022
In January, McIlroy was in contention to win the Slync.io Dubai Desert Classic for the third time in his career but hit his second shot into the water on the final hole and missed out on a playoff for the title by one stroke. In April, a bogey-free 64 in the final round saw him jump from a tie for ninth to finish as runner-up in the Masters Tournament.

In June, McIlroy successfully defended his title at the RBC Canadian Open, shooting a final-round 62 to win by two shots ahead of Tony Finau. In July, McIlroy finished in third place at The Open Championship, having entered the final round tied for the lead alongside Viktor Hovland, to end the major season with top-10 finishes in each one. On 28 August, McIlroy won his third Tour Championship, by one stroke from Scottie Scheffler and Im Sung-jae, to claim his third FedEx Cup victory, surpassing Tiger Woods's two, and earn an additional $18 million bonus. In September, he finished tied-second at the BMW PGA Championship, losing to Shane Lowry by one shot.

In October, McIlroy successfully defended the CJ Cup at Congaree Golf Club in South Carolina. This victory also saw him move to number one in the Official World Golf Ranking, overtaking Scottie Scheffler.

In November, McIlroy entered the DP World Tour Championship on the European Tour sitting in first place on the DP World Tour Rankings. With a fourth place finish, it was good enough for McIlroy to maintain his position at the top of the rankings. It was also his fourth Harry Vardon Trophy win.

2023
McIlroy started off the year by winning the Hero Dubai Desert Classic on the European Tour. He birdied the final two holes to beat Patrick Reed by one shot.

Awards
In 2012, besides leading the PGA Tour money list, McIlroy won the PGA Player of the Year, PGA Tour Player of the Year, Vardon Trophy, and Byron Nelson Award. In addition to winning the Race to Dubai, he was voted the European Tour Golfer of the Year. He also won the Mark H. McCormack Award for leading the Official World Golf Ranking for the most weeks in the year (28 of 52 weeks). Also in 2012, he won a Laureus World Sports Award in the category Breakthrough of the Year.

In 2014, McIlroy again swept the PGA Tour awards: Arnold Palmer Award (leading money winner), PGA Player of the Year, PGA Tour Player of the Year, Vardon Trophy, and Byron Nelson Award. He also won the Race to Dubai and was voted the European Tour Golfer of the Year. He again won the Mark H. McCormack Award for leading the Official World Golf Ranking for the most weeks in the year (22 of 52 weeks). He was awarded the RTÉ Sports Person of the Year for the second time, previously winning in 2011, and the BBC Northern Ireland Sports Personality of the Year for the third time after victories in 2011 and 2012. He also came 2nd in the BBC Sports Personality of the Year award, behind Formula 1 World Champion Lewis Hamilton. In 2015 McIlroy was shortlisted for the Laureus World Sportsman of the Year. In 2015, McIlroy won European Tour Golfer of the Year for the third time (2012, 2014).

In 2019, McIlroy won the PGA Tour Player of the Year award for the third time (2012, 2014). He also won the Vardon Trophy and Byron Nelson Award for a third time.

In 2022, McIlroy won the Vardon Trophy and Byron Nelson Award for a fourth time.

Technique, additional mentors and coaches
McIlroy employs the interlocking grip on full shots. He has worked with various professional golfers since he was young, including Darren Clarke, Nick Faldo, and Graeme McDowell. McDowell frequently plays practice rounds at Tour events with McIlroy.

McIlroy obtained putting assistance and instruction from Dave Stockton, a retired PGA Tour player who works as a putting instructor. He was first managed by Englishman Andrew "Chubby" Chandler, a former European Tour player who founded International Sports Management (ISM).

McIlroy left ISM in 2011, with McIlroy joining Dublin-based Horizon Sports Management. Michael Bannon has been working with McIlroy since the players childhood, going full-time with McIlroy in 2012.

Controversies

In March 2015, McIlroy threw a club into the water at the WGC-Cadillac Championship after hitting his ball into the water on the par-5 eighth hole during the second round at Doral. McIlroy subsequently apologised for throwing the club saying: "It felt good at the time but now I regret it. Frustration got the better of me."

On the eve of the Open Championship in 2016, McIlroy said he would not watch the golf tournament at the Olympic Games and would focus on the sports like swimming and track & field having previously withdrawn from representing Ireland in the games due to the threat of the Zika virus in Brazil. Following the tournament, McIlroy went on to admit his surprise at how successful it had been, and that he had been wrong to dismiss it. In May 2019, McIlroy outlined his intention to compete at the 2020 Olympic Games, representing Ireland.

On the eve of Hero Dubai Desert Classic in January 2023, McIlroy found himself at the center of controversy with Patrick Reed. While practicing on the range at the Emirates Golf Club, LIV Golf Tour player Reed seemingly approached the Northern Irishman, but ended up tossing a golf tee in his general direction when McIlroy apparently failed to acknowledge the American. McIlroy has been a vocal critic of the breakaway LIV Golf Tour, of which Patrick Reed was one of the first joinees. While LIV Golf players are barred from competing on the PGA Tour, many erstwhile PGA Tour regulars are playing on the DP World Tour (European tour) to earn Official World Golf Ranking (OWGR) points in a bid to avoid a drop in rankings.

Endorsements
McIlroy has been cited as the most exciting young prospect in golf and as having the potential to become one of the highest earners in sports in terms of endorsements. In 2013 SportsPro rated him the third-most marketable athlete in the world (after Neymar and Lionel Messi).  In January 2013 he signed a large endorsement deal with Nike, with wide speculation on its terms. Initial  rumours of a 10-year/$250 million accord ratcheted down to a more likely $100 million deal of an undetermined length. In 2017, McIlroy signed a 10-year, $200 million contract extension with Nike for apparel only after Nike exited the golf equipment business, allowing him to additionally sign a 10-year, $100 million equipment deal with TaylorMade to use their clubs, ball, and bag.

McIlroy was an ambassador for Jumeirah group from 2007 to 2012.
McIlroy is the namesake for EA Sports' video game Rory McIlroy PGA Tour, replacing Tiger Woods, who had been the previous namesake for the series from 1998 to 2013. EA (Electronic Arts) transitioned from Tiger Woods to Rory McIlroy after he became the world's number one golfer in 2015.

Personal life
McIlroy was raised Roman Catholic and has self-identified as Irish, Northern Irish and British. He carries a British passport, although he usually is reluctant to discuss his nationality at length. In June 2014, McIlroy declared that he would represent Ireland (if he qualified) at the 2016 Olympic Summer Games, where golf became an Olympic event for the first time since 1904. In 2012 he had expressed an interest in representing Great Britain as opposed to Ireland. However, in January 2013 he was considering playing for Britain or Ireland or not playing at all: "I just think being from where we're from, we're placed in a very difficult position. I feel Northern Irish and obviously being from Northern Ireland you have a connection to Ireland and a connection to the UK. If I could and there was a Northern Irish team I'd play for Northern Ireland. Play for one side or the other – or not play at all because I may upset too many people... Those are my three options I'm considering very carefully". He subsequently chose to represent Ireland in 2014.

McIlroy lived near the village of Moneyreagh in County Down, about 20 minutes from Belfast. The land around his home included a custom-made practice facility and a scaled-down football pitch. In September 2012, the house was put up for sale for a price of £2 million. In December 2012, McIlroy purchased a $10-million property in Palm Beach Gardens, Florida, located close to Jack Nicklaus' The Bear's Club.

McIlroy is an Ambassador for UNICEF Ireland and made his first visit to Haiti with UNICEF in June 2011. In 2014, McIlroy was also announced as an official ambassador for PGA Junior League Golf. His great-uncle Joe McIlroy was killed by the Ulster Volunteer Force in a sectarian attack at his East Belfast home in November 1972.

McIlroy is a fan of Manchester United F.C. In his acceptance speech following his 2014 Open Championship win at Royal Liverpool, McIlroy joked: "Even though I'm a Man United fan standing here", which saw him booed in jest by rival Liverpool fans, before he thanked them for their great support. McIlroy is a fan of the Northern Ireland national team.

McIlroy plays the sport in his spare time. He injured ankle ligaments in 2015 while playing football with friends, which forced him to miss the 2015 Open Championship, but later stated he would not give up playing football.

McIlroy is a fan of Ulster Rugby and often interrupts his busy golfing schedule to attend rugby matches at Kingspan Stadium, formerly Ravenhill Stadium in Belfast.

McIlroy was appointed Member of the Order of the British Empire (MBE) in the 2012 New Year Honours for services to sport.

According to the 2017 Forbes' list of the world's highest-paid athletes, McIlroy was the joint sixth highest-paid sportsperson that year, having earned US$50 million, of which $34 million came from endorsements. 

McIlroy created a new company, Rory McIlroy Management Services Ltd, in 2013. Headed by Donal Casey, it manages the royalty payments from McIlroy's various endorsements.

In 2015, McIlroy reached an out of court settlement with, Horizon Sports Management in Dublin. The protracted legal dispute hinged on whether outstanding contractual fees claimed for a period up to 2017, were payable under contracts signed when McIlroy was 22. He has reportedly agreed to pay between £13-£20 million to his former management company, Horizon to end the litigation claims between all parties.

In February 2018, McIlroy appeared on an episode of Amazon Prime show The Grand Tour, racing against  Paris Hilton in the 'Celebrity Face-Off' segment of the show.

McIlroy dated Danish tennis professional Caroline Wozniacki from 2011 to 2014. They became engaged on 31 December 2013 but ended their engagement on 21 May 2014.

McIlroy started dating a former PGA of America employee, Erica Stoll, in 2015. In December 2015, they became engaged while on holiday in Paris. They married in April 2017 at Ashford Castle in Cong, County Mayo. The couple had a daughter Poppy Kennedy McIlroy in September 2020.

McIlroy appears in the sports documentary series Full Swing, which premiered on Netflix on February 15, 2023.

Amateur wins
2005 West of Ireland Championship, Irish Amateur Close Championship
2006 West of Ireland Championship, Irish Amateur Close Championship, European Amateur

Professional wins (36)

PGA Tour wins (23)

1Started tournament at −5 FedEx Cup playoffs adjustment, scored −13 to par.
2Started tournament at −4 FedEx Cup playoffs adjustment, scored −17 to par.

PGA Tour playoff record (2–2)

European Tour wins (15)

1Co-sanctioned by the Asian Tour

European Tour playoff record (1–4)

PGA Tour of Australasia wins (1)

1Co-sanctioned by the OneAsia Tour

Other wins (4)

Other playoff record (1–0)

Major championships

Wins (4)

Results timeline
Results not in chronological order in 2020.

LA = Low amateur
CUT = missed the halfway cut
"T" = tied
NT = No tournament due to COVID-19 pandemic

Summary 

Most consecutive cuts made – 9 (2013 PGA – 2016 Masters)
Longest streak of top-10s – 4 (twice, current)

The Players Championship

Wins (1)

Results timeline

CUT = missed the halfway cut
"T" indicates a tie for a place
C = Cancelled after the first round due to the COVID-19 pandemic

World Golf Championships

Wins (3)

Results timeline
Results not in chronological order before 2015.

1Cancelled due to COVID-19 pandemic

QF, R16, R32, R64 = Round in which player lost in match play
NT = no tournament
"T" = tied

Professional career summary

European Tour

*As of the 31 December 2022.

PGA Tour

Note that there is double counting of money earned (and wins) in the majors and World Golf Championships since they are official events on both tours.

Team appearances
Amateur
European Boys' Team Championship (representing Ireland): 2004
Junior Ryder Cup (representing Europe): 2004 (winners)
European Amateur Team Championship (representing Ireland): 2005, 2007 (winners)
European Youths' Team Championship (representing Ireland): 2006
Eisenhower Trophy (representing Ireland): 2006
St Andrews Trophy (representing Great Britain & Ireland): 2006 (winners)
Walker Cup (representing Great Britain & Ireland): 2007
Bonallack Trophy (representing Europe): 2006 (winners)

Professional
Ryder Cup (representing Europe): 2010 (winners), 2012 (winners), 2014 (winners), 2016, 2018 (winners), 2021
Seve Trophy (representing Great Britain & Ireland): 2009 (winners)
World Cup (representing Ireland): 2009, 2011

See also

List of golfers with most European Tour wins
List of golfers with most PGA Tour wins
List of men's major championships winning golfers

References

External links
 
 
 
 
 
 
 

Male golfers from Northern Ireland
European Tour golfers
PGA Tour golfers
Winners of men's major golf championships
Ryder Cup competitors for Europe
Golfers at the 2020 Summer Olympics
Olympic golfers of Ireland
Members of the Order of the British Empire
Laureus World Sports Awards winners
RTÉ Sports Person of the Year winners
People educated at Sullivan Upper School
People from Holywood, County Down
Sportspeople from County Down
1989 births
Living people